Jenn Grinels is an American musician, singer and songwriter, and actress.  Originally from Northern California, Grinels is an indie artist who has grown a large grassroots fanbase through constant touring over the past decade.

History
Jenn Grinels is nationally touring singer/songwriter, recording artist and composer. The Nashville based musician has spent most of the last eleven years performing nearly 1500 concerts in venues ranging from Villa Montalvo to Lincoln Center, performing arts centers to listening rooms, living rooms and universities.  She has shared the stage with artists including the 10,000 Maniacs, Christopher Cross, Marc Broussard, Edwin McCain, and Marc Cohn.

Raised in Cupertino, CA, Jenn’s path to music started in school and church choirs, local musical theater productions, and a garage rock band that consisted of jazz students from Monta Vista, Fremont, and Homestead High school. Grinels studied musical theater at UC Irvine and worked steadily in professional theaters around Southern California until 2007. That year she completed her first studio album and made the decision to give up her apartment, put her belongings in storage and set out as a traveling troubadour.

Her song Can't Stay Here was featured on MTV's Real World/Road Rules Challenge: The Island.

Grinels released her second full-length album, brokenHEARTbreaker, in May 2012.

Musical style
Grinels' music is characterized by acoustic guitar and powerful vocals.  Her vocal delivery has elements of folk, pop rock, jazz, and blues.

Awards
 2007 Honoring Acoustic Talent Award - Best Performer
 2007 Honoring Acoustic Talent Award - Best Vocalist
 West Coast Songwriters' Song Contest, Song of the Year: "Can't Stay Here" (little words)- 
 2010 APCA Best Female Solo Artist 
 2011 APCA Best Female Solo Artist 
 2012 APCA Best Female Solo Artist 
 2012 Best Music Act  - Campus Activities Magazine

Discography
 little words, 2007
 brokenHEARTbreaker, 2012
 Live at the Rutledge, 2015
 Go Mine (upcoming), 2020

As a Sideman
"KILR", 2011

References

American women composers
21st-century American composers
American women singer-songwriters
American folk guitarists
American women guitarists
American folk singers
Musicians from San Diego
Actresses from San Diego
Living people
Singer-songwriters from California
People from Cupertino, California
Year of birth missing (living people)
Guitarists from California
21st-century American women musicians
21st-century women composers